7L may refer to:
Sun D'Or, former IATA code 
DJ 7L, stage name of George Andrinopoulos of 7L & Esoteric
 7L is the type number of the Volkswagen Touareg sports utility vehicle
MG 7L, a model of MG 7
Soyuz 7L, see Soyuz 7K-L1
7L, the production code for the 1988 Doctor Who serial The Happiness Patrol

See also
L7 (disambiguation)